"3 Nights" is the debut single by American singer and rapper Dominic Fike. It was released as a single from his Don't Forget About Me, Demos EP through Columbia Records on October 16, 2018, and peaked within the top ten of the charts in Australia, Belgium (Flanders), Croatia, Israel, the Netherlands, New Zealand, the Republic of Ireland and the United Kingdom, and within the top forty of the charts in Germany. "3 Nights" revolves around Fike staying up late at a motel in the "City of Palms," otherwise known as Fort Myers, Florida, and the conversations and nude pictures he receives from a girl. The lyrics include Fike offering said girl to stay with him and call him "what you want, when you want, if you want."

Critical reception
In a profile on Fike, The New Yorker said the parent EP of the song is "nostalgic for the early-two-thousands beach-bonfire style of Jack Johnson, with some of the watered-down reggae of 311 and the Red Hot Chili Peppers." It further said "3 Nights" could "generously be classified as high-quality retail music", calling it "easy to listen to" and comparing it to "Rude" by Canadian reggae fusion band Magic! Matthew Strauss of Pitchfork gave the track a negative review; he described it as "absolutely harmless to a fault" and "neither soothing nor pleasant", further criticizing its lyrics as "mildly endearing but utterly forgettable".

Music video
A music video directed by Nathan Rickard was released on April 4, 2019, and features Fike with friends in his hometown of Naples, Florida and Miami International Inn Motel, with a snippet of an unreleased song being played at the end. Kevin Abstract also shared an alternate video he directed for the song, which was described by Fike as "messing around".

Charts

Weekly charts

Year-end charts

Certifications

References

2018 debut singles
2018 songs
Dominic Fike songs
Columbia Records singles
Songs written by Dominic Fike